Macrocoma carbonaria is a species of leaf beetle of Algeria, described by Édouard Lefèvre in 1876.

References

carbonaria
Beetles of North Africa
Beetles described in 1876
Taxa named by Édouard Lefèvre